Sainte-Ursule is a municipality in the Mauricie region of the province of Quebec in Canada.

References 

Municipalities in Quebec
Incorporated places in Mauricie